The Estadio León, unofficially known as Nou Camp, is a mid-sized football stadium with a seating capacity of 31,297 built in 1967, and located in the city of León, Guanajuato, in the Bajío region of central Mexico. 

Because of its excellent location and facilities, this stadium hosted matches for the 1970 FIFA World Cup, 1983 FIFA World Youth Championship, and the 1986 FIFA World Cup. It also hosted football matches during the 1968 Summer Olympics. During those games, it seated 23,609.

On March 8, 2017, judiciary officials of the city of León determined that ownership of Estadio León is still in fact property of Zermeño Reyes y Héctor González. It is unknown if negotiations will begin for Grupo Pachuca to purchase the stadium. One possible alternative was the New Estadio León, originally proposed in 2008.

1970 FIFA World Cup

1986 FIFA World Cup

References

Club León
Sports venues in Guanajuato
Buildings and structures in León, Guanajuato
Football venues in Mexico
Olympic football venues
1970 FIFA World Cup stadiums
1986 FIFA World Cup stadiums
Venues of the 1968 Summer Olympics